Bagontaas is the fourth most populous barangay in Valencia City (as of 2015). Development of the Barangay was known gradually because of the about to be constructed Robinsons Place, Toyota Valencia, and 7-Eleven near the MVC crossing. The Official Public school in Bagontaas is Bagontaas Central Elementary School. There are schools in Bagontaas like Central Bukidnon Institute, Bagontaas Adventist Elementary Schools and more.

References

Barangays of Valencia, Bukidnon